Chela is a genus of small cyprinid freshwater fish from  South Asia that are closely related to Laubuka.

Species
There are currently 3 recognized species in this genus:

 Chela cachius (F. Hamilton, 1822) (Silver hatchet chela)
 Chela macrolepis Knight & Rema Devi, 2014
 Chela khujairokensis Arunkumar, 2000

References

Chela (fish)
Fish of Asia